Omikronpapillomavirus is a genus of viruses, in the family Papillomaviridae. Porpoises serve as natural hosts. There is only one species in this genus: Omikronpapillomavirus 1. Diseases associated with this genus include: causes genital warts.

Structure
Viruses in Omikronpapillomavirus are non-enveloped, with icosahedral geometries, and T=7 symmetry. The diameter is around 52-55 nm. Genomes are circular, around 8kb in length. The genome has 7 open reading frames.

Life cycle
Viral replication is nuclear. Entry into the host cell is achieved by attachment of the viral proteins to host receptors, which mediates endocytosis. Replication follows the dsDNA bidirectional replication model. DNA-templated transcription, with some alternative splicing mechanism is the method of transcription. The virus exits the host cell by nuclear envelope breakdown.
Porpoises serve as the natural host. Transmission routes are contact.

References

External links
 ICTV Report Papillomaviridae
 Viralzone: Omikronpapillomavirus

Papillomavirus
Virus genera